The following outline is provided as an overview of a topical guide to design:

Design (as a verb: to design) is the intentional creation of a plan or specification for the construction or manufacturing of an object or system or for the implementation of an activity or process. 
Design (as a noun: a design) can refer to such a plan or specification (e.g. a drawing or other document) or to the created object, etc., and features of it such as aesthetic, functional, economic or socio-political.

Design professions
 Architecture – An Architect typically has a B.Arch or M.Arch, as well as professional certification through groups such as the NCARB. Their primary focus is the design of buildings.
 Engineering – An Engineer typically has a BS or MS degree, as well as professional certification as a Professional Engineer. They primarily focus on applyi. No professional certification is required. Their primary focus is the design of apparel.
 Graphic design – A Graphic Designer typically has a BFA or MFA. No professional certification is required. Their primary focus is the design of visual communication.
 Industrial design – An Industrial Designer typically has a BFA or MFA. No professional certification is required. Their primary focus is the design of physical, functional objects.
 Interior design – An Interior Designer typically has a Bachelor's degree. No professional certification is required. Their primary focus is the design of human environment, particularly affecting aesthetics and emotions.
 Software design – A Software designer typically has a BS or MS degree in computer science. While professional certification is not required, many exist. Their primary focus is the functional design of computer software.

Design approaches and methods
 Co-Design
 Creative problem solving
 Creativity techniques
 Design-build
 Design for X
 Design management
 Design methods
 Design Science
 Design thinking
 Engineering design process
 Error-tolerant design
 Fault tolerant design
 Functional design
 WebDesign
 Metadesign
 Mind mapping
 Open-design movement
 Participatory design
 Reliable system design
 Strategic design
 TRIZ
 Universal design
 User innovation

Design activities
 Creativity
 Design methods
 Design thinking

Designing objects
 Business
 New product development
 Engineering
 Cellular manufacturing
 Mechanical engineering
 New product development
 System design
 Fashion
 Fashion design
 Graphic design
 Game design
 Packaging design
 Industrial design
 Automotive design
 Industrial design
 New product development
 Product design
 Software design
 Game design
 New product development
 Software engineering
 Software design
 Software development
 Other
 Furniture
 Floral design

System design
 System design
 Business
 Business design
 New product development
 Service design
 Engineering
 Graphic design
 Information design

Design tools
  Computer-aided design
 Graphic organizers

Environments and experiences
 Architects
 Building design
 Urban design
 Graphic design
 Communication design
 Motion graphic design
 User interface design
 Web design
 Interior design
 Experience design
 Interaction design
 Software design
 User experience design
 Other
 Garden design
 Landscape design
 Sound design
 Theatrical design

Impact of design
 Creative industries
 Design classic

Design organizations
 European Design Awards
 Chartered Society of Designers
 The Design Association

Studying design
 Critical design
 Design research
 Wicked problem – problem that is difficult or impossible to solve because of incomplete, contradictory, and changing requirements that are often difficult to recognize. The use of term "wicked" here has come to denote resistance to resolution, rather than evil. Moreover, because of complex interdependencies, the effort to solve one aspect of a wicked problem may reveal or create other problems.

See also

References

External links

Design Search Engine

Design
Design